The Church of St. John the Evangelist is a Roman Catholic parish church in the Roman Catholic Archdiocese of New York, located at 355 East 55th Street at First Avenue, Manhattan, New York City.

Parish
The parish was established in 1830. Or according to other sources in 1841 "with a rather stormy history." The church originally stood on the site of the present St. Patrick's Cathedral, Manhattan. The first Catholic presence of the site there dated from 1810 when the Society of Jesus moved their academy to a fine old house on 50th Street and Fifth Avenue where they created a chapel of St. Ignatius. The chapel was then occupied by Trappist monks from 1813 to 1815, and appears to have ceased function after that. Bishop of New York John Dubois reopened the chapel in 1840 for Catholics employed at the Deaf and Dumb Asylum and in the general neighborhood. A modest frame church was built and dedicated 9 May 1841 by the Rev. John Hughes, administrator of the diocese. Tickets were sold to the dedication to ease the parish's debt level, managed by a lay Board of Trustees, but to no avail and the property mortgage was finally foreclosed on and the church sold at auction. The stress is said to have contributed to the death that year of the church's pastor, the Rev. Felix Larkin. The experience was blamed on the management of the trustees and this incident is said to have played a significant role in the abolishment of the lay trusteeship, which occurred shortly thereafter. The young and energetic Rev. Michael A. Curran was appointed to raise funds for the devastated parish, and shortly fitted up an old college hall as a temporary church. Fr. Curran continued raising funds to buy back the church during the Great Famine in Ireland, eventually succeeding and taking the deed in his own name. "The site of St. Patrick's Cathedral, hence, came to the Church through the labors of this young priest and the self-denial of his countrymen and not by the fight of the city." The debt was finally all paid for by 1853, by which time it had become clear that a larger church for the parish was needed elsewhere as its current site had been selected for the new cathedral.

Rev. James McMahon (later of Catholic University) had a new church built one block east of Madison Avenue, freeing the previous site for St. Patrick's Cathedral. The new church measured 140 by 90 feet and contained an organ valued at $30,000, which was constructed under the direction of Fr. McMahon, who was a skilled musician. A fire on 10 January 1871 destroyed both church and organ, yet the church was rebuilt again within a year. With the opening of St. Patrick's in 1879, St. John's parish was removed eastward in 1879 to its current location. In 1914, the Catholic population of the parish was around 7,000 and the property valued at $425,000.

Pastors
?-1841: Rev. Felix Larkin (d.1841)
1841-?: Rev. Michael A. Curran
Rev. James McMahon
Rev. John T. O'Reilly was transferred from here (presumably as assistant) to St. John the Evangelist Church (Manhattan) in 1904.

Buildings
Under Monsignor James J. Flood, P.R., a new church was begun at the corner of 55th Street and First Ave. in 1880 and completed in 1886. A brick garage was built 1947 at 344-348 E 56th Street to the designs of architect George J. Sole of 110 East 42nd Street for $900.

The 1886 church stood until 1969, when it was demolished to allow construction of the Archdiocese of New York headquarters, which incorporates the church within the building.

School
The church had a four-story brick and stone school at the southwest corner of First Avenue and 56th Street built in 1907 to the designs of architect Franklin A Green and John V. Van Pelt, Associated of 333 Fourth Avenue for $80,000. The parish school opened in 1908. In 1914, the school had 497 boys and 500 girls, run by 11 Sisters of Charity and 7 lay teachers.

External links
 St. John the Evangelist official website

References 

Roman Catholic churches completed in 1907
20th-century Roman Catholic church buildings in the United States
Religious organizations established in 1830
Roman Catholic churches in Manhattan
Midtown Manhattan
1830 establishments in New York (state)